The Terengganu State Legislative Assembly is the unicameral state legislature of the Malaysian state of Terengganu. It consists of 32 members representing single-member constituencies throughout the state. Elections are held no more than five years apart, and are customarily held alongside elections to the federal parliament during a general election.

The State Assembly convenes at the Wisma Darul Iman in the state capital, Kuala Terengganu.

Composition

Seating arrangement

Role

The Terengganu State Assembly's main function is to enact state laws and policies. It is also in charge of oversight of departments and agencies of the state government. Members of the assembly are responsible for checking and criticizing the executive government's actions.

The leader of the party or coalition with a majority of seats in the assembly is appointed Menteri Besar by the Sultan of Terengganu. The Menteri Besar then appoints members of the state executive council, or EXCO (Majlis Mesyuarat Kerajaan Negeri) from members of the assembly.

Committees
The State Assembly consists of committees to handle administrative matters, including Committee of Privileges and Public Accounts Committee.

Election pendulum 
The 14th General Election witnessed 22 governmental seats and 10 non-governmental seats filled the Terengganu State Legislative Assembly. The government side has 3 safe seats and 4 fairly safe seats, while the non-government side has just a safe and fairly safe seat.

List of Assemblies

References

External links
Portal Rasmi Dewan Undangan Negeri Terengganu Darul Iman (Official site) 

 
State legislatures of Malaysia
Unicameral legislatures
Politics of Terengganu